Nationality words link to articles with information on the nation's poetry or literature (for instance, Irish or France).

Events
 John Dryden becomes poet laureate of England on the death of Sir William Davenant. Dryden held the office until 1688 when, after James II of England was deposed, the poet refused to swear allegiance to the new monarchs and was replaced by Thomas Shadwell. Dryden was the only laureate not to die in office until Andrew Motion in 1999. Shadwell held the office until his death in 1692.)

Works published
 Sir John Denham, Poems and Translations: With The Sophy, the first collected edition of Denham's poems
 John Dryden, Defence of an Essay of Dramatic Poesy, criticism
 Richard Flecknoe, Sir William D'Avenant's Voyage to the Other World: with his Adventures in the Poets Elizium: A poetical fiction, published anonymously
 Sir Robert Howard, The Duell of the Staggs
 Philip Pain, Daily Meditations, English Colonial American
 Georg Stiernhielm – Musæ Suethizantes

Births
Death years link to the corresponding "[year] in poetry" article:
 January 5 (bapt.) – Alicia D'Anvers, born Alicia Clarke (died 1725), English
 February 19 – John Reynolds (died 1727), English Presbyterian minister and religious writer
 December 20 (bapt.) – Sarah Fyge Egerton (died 1723), English poet

Deaths
Birth years link to the corresponding "[year] in poetry" article:
 February 2 – Antonio del Castillo y Saavedra (born 1616), Spanish Baroque painter, sculptor and poet
 February 23 – Owen Feltham (born 1602), English essayist and poet
 April 7 – Sir William Davenant (born 1606), English playwright and poet
 August 9 – Jakob Balde (born 1604), German scholar, poet and teacher
 Arnauld de Oihenart (born 1592), Basque historian and poet

See also

 Poetry
 17th century in poetry
 17th century in literature
 Restoration literature

Notes

17th-century poetry
Poetry